Johannes Maria Bernhard "Hannes" Nikel (13 April 1931 – 26 September 2001) was a German film editor. He is best known for his works in Das Boot (1981) and Stalingrad (1993), the former of which earned him an Academy Award nomination.

Life and work

Hannes Nikel was nominated for the Academy Award for Best Film Editing for his work in the film Das Boot (1981).

Awards

1992 Bavarian Film Award, Best Editing

External links

1931 births
2001 deaths
German film editors
Film people from Munich